OMD Live: Architecture & Morality & More is a live album and DVD by Orchestral Manoeuvres in the Dark, based on the group's 1981 album, Architecture & Morality. It was recorded at the Hammersmith Apollo, London on Saturday 19 May 2007.

Track listing

CD

UK release
Release date: 
"Architecture & Morality"
"Sealand"
"The New Stone Age"
"Georgia"
"She's Leaving"
"Souvenir"
"Joan of Arc"
"Joan of Arc (Maid of Orleans)"
"The Beginning and the End"
"If You Leave"
"(Forever) Live and Die"
"Pandora's Box"
"Locomotion"
"Sailing on the Seven Seas"
"Enola Gay"
"Electricity"
"The Romance Of The Telescope"

US release
Release date: 
"Architecture & Morality"
"Sealand"
"The New Stone Age"
"Georgia"
"She's Leaving"
"Souvenir"
"Joan of Arc"
"Joan of Arc (Maid of Orleans)"
"The Beginning and the End"
"If You Leave"
"(Forever) Live and Die"
"Enola Gay"
"Electricity"

DVD
"Architecture & Morality"
"Sealand"
"The New Stone Age"
"Georgia"
"She's Leaving"
"Souvenir"
"Joan of Arc"
"Joan of Arc (Maid of Orleans)"
"The Beginning and the End"
"Messages"
"Tesla Girls"
"(Forever) Live and Die"
"If You Leave"
"Pandora's Box"
"Talking Loud & Clear"
"So in Love"
"Locomotion"
"Sailing on the Seven Seas"
"Enola Gay"
"Walking on the Milky Way"
"Electricity"
"The Romance of the Telescope"

Orchestral Manoeuvres in the Dark albums
Live video albums
2008 live albums
2008 video albums
Albums recorded at the Hammersmith Apollo